Darren Kenny   (born 17 March 1970) is a British road and track racing cyclist and Paralympian. Kenny's results have made him one of his sport's biggest stars; his dominance over multiple Paralympics gave rise to his nickname of 'Daz the Destroyer'.

Darren Kenny OBE retired from competition in 2013. He is now the founder/owner of Estrella Bikes.

Career
Born in Salisbury, Wiltshire, Kenny now lives in Verwood, Dorset. Having been involved in cycling since he was young, Kenny started racing at the age of eleven. In 1988, at the age of 19, an accident at the Tour of Ireland whilst descending the Wicklow Gap looked likely to have ended his career. He had damaged his neck, but did not realise the extent of the damage at the time. A series of accidents after that, notably tripping over a black cat whilst working as a milkman in Bournemouth, exacerbated his condition, as Kenny put it: "until I was just lying on the sofa putting on weight and on heavy medication."

At the age of 30, Kenny returned to cycling, initially to improve his fitness, but he soon began racing once more. Encouraged by a friend, Kenny contacted British Cycling to find out more about Paralympics racing. He competed at the British National Track Championships, achieving some good times, he was invited onto the Paralympic squad.

In January 2008, Kenny was nominated for "Sportsperson of the Year with a Disability" Laureus World Sports Awards, which recognise sporting achievement during the previous year.

Kenny managed to set a new world record in the preliminary round of the Individual pursuit (CP 3) at the 2008 Paralympics. The new record was 5.812 seconds faster than his own previous world record.

Kenny was appointed Officer of the Order of the British Empire (OBE) in the 2009 New Year Honours for services to disabled sport. Awarded an Honorary Doctorate of Arts by Bournemouth University in 2009 and an Honorary Degree Masters in Science by Brighton University.

Awards include: Variety Club Disabled Sportsman 2004, BBC South Sports Personality of the Year 2005, BBC South West Paralympian of the Year 2008, BBC South Disabled Sports Personality of the Year 2004, Sports Journalist Award for Disabled Sportsman of the Year.

Results 

2004
, Kilo, Paralympics, Athens
, Pursuit, Paralympics, Athens
, Combined Road Race and Time Trial, Paralympics, Athens

2005
 World Para-Cycling Best Hour Performance (C3): 41.817 km
, 200m, World Disability Championships
, Kilo, World Disability Championships
, Pursuit, World Disability Championships
, Team Sprint, World Disability Championships
, Road Race, World Disability Championships
, Time Trial, World Disability Championships

2006
, Kilo, World Disability Championships
, Pursuit, World Disability Championships
, Time Trial, World Disability Championships
, Road Race, World Disability Championships

2007
, Kilo, World Disability Championships
, Pursuit, World Disability Championships
, Time Trial, World Disability Championships
, Road Race

2008
 Men's 1km time trial (CP 3), Paralympics, Beijing
 Men's team sprint (LC1–4 CP3/4), Paralympics, Beijing (with Mark Bristow and Jody Cundy)
 Individual pursuit (CP 3), Paralympics, Beijing
 Men's road race (LC 3–4/CP 3), Paralympics, Beijing
 Men's road time trial (CP 3), Paralympics, Beijing

2009
 World Para-Cycling hour record (C3): 40.516 km
2012
 Mixed Team Sprint (C1-5), Paralympics, London
 Individual pursuit (C 3), Paralympics, London

References

External links 

British Cycling Bio

1970 births
Living people
English male cyclists
Paralympic cyclists of Great Britain
Cyclists at the 2004 Summer Paralympics
Cyclists at the 2008 Summer Paralympics
Paralympic gold medalists for Great Britain
Paralympic silver medalists for Great Britain
Sportspeople from Salisbury
Officers of the Order of the British Empire
Cyclists at the 2012 Summer Paralympics
UCI Para-cycling World Champions
Medalists at the 2004 Summer Paralympics
Medalists at the 2008 Summer Paralympics
Medalists at the 2012 Summer Paralympics
Paralympic bronze medalists for Great Britain
Paralympic medalists in cycling